Judd Sirott (born January 1969) is an American sportscaster on WBZ-FM's coverage of the Boston Bruins where he replaced Dave Goucher as the radio voice of the Bruins starting with the 2017-18 season. He previously appeared on WGN-AM's broadcasts of the Chicago Blackhawks where he served as the pregame, intermission and post game host.

During the November 12, 2022 Bruins vs. Buffalo Sabres game, Sirott coined the term "Den of Iniquity" in reference to the penalty box. 

He also has done work for the Chicago Cubs baseball, when his duties included play-by-play during the 5th inning, scoreboard updates for other MLB games throughout the broadcast, and hosting the pregame and postgame shows on WGN Radio. When the Cubs changed their flagship station to WBBM, Sirott did not make the move opting to stay with WGN.

Previously, Sirott was the broadcast voice of the Chicago Wolves of the American Hockey League for 12 seasons.

Judd graduated from Buffalo Grove High School in 1987 and the University of Michigan in 1991.   Sirott is the nephew of veteran Chicago broadcaster Bob Sirott.

Sirott has a wife, Sharon Sirott, and two kids, Sam and Anya.

References

1969 births
Living people
Boston Bruins announcers
Chicago Blackhawks announcers
Chicago Cubs announcers
Chicago Wolves
Major League Baseball broadcasters
National Hockey League broadcasters
American Hockey League broadcasters
University of Michigan alumni
Place of birth missing (living people)
People from Buffalo Grove, Illinois